Gary Wayne Johnston
(October 21, 1964 – January 20, 2022) was a United States Army major general who last served as the commanding general of the United States Army Intelligence and Security Command (INSCOM) from June 2018 to July 2021. As commander of the direct reporting unit, he served as the overall mission commander for the Army's 17,500 operational intelligence forces and a key source of logistics and support to the United States Intelligence Community. Prior to leading INSCOM, he held various roles in Army intelligence supporting U.S. operations in primarily Southwest Asia.

Military career 

In his 34 year career in the United States Army, Johnston held command at every level from company to two-star general. He served in outside the contiguous United States in Germany, Hawaii, and Afghanistan.

Johnston’s career skewed toward US operations in Southwest Asia. Early in his career, he served in Operation Desert Storm as a squadron intelligence officer in the 3rd Armored Cavalry (1990–1991). From 2005 to 2018, he served four tours in Afghanistan, commanding the 165th MI Battalion as part of Combined Joint Task Force (CJTF) 76, then the 504th Battlefield Surveillance Brigade as part of CJTF 82. He returned to Afghanistan eighteen months later, serving as the deputy J-2 for the International Security Assistance Force (ISAF) Joint Command in Afghanistan (2014). 

Returning to the US, Johnston was assigned as G-2 of the XVIII Airborne Corps (2012–2015), before becoming J-2 at U.S. Special Operations Command (USSOCOM) from 2016 to 2017. In late 2017 Johnston deployed to Afghanistan for the last time, dual-hatted as J-2 for U.S. Forces in Afghanistan and the Deputy Chief of Staff, Intelligence for the NATO Resolute Support Mission.

Command of INSCOM 
From June 2018 to July 2021, Johnston moved to Fort Belvoir, Virginia, to lead U.S. Army Intelligence and Security Command (INSCOM), the Army component of the U.S. Intelligence Community and the Central Security Service. Despite the limitations imposed by the COVID-19 pandemic, during his tenure Johnston spearheaded the development of Army Counterintelligence Command and activation of a dedicated military intelligence group for Army Cyber Command. As commander of INSCOM, Johnston also led investigations into the suicides of his senior enlisted advisor, Command Sergeant Major Eric M. Schmitz, and clandestine intelligence operative sergeant first class Michael Froede.

Johnston relinquished command in July 2021 and after terminal leave, retired in October 2021.

Retirement 
Following his retirement in October 2021, Johnston joined the board of North Carolina-based defense contractor Leyden Solutions.

Personal life 
Johnston was born in Russellville, Arkansas in 1964. He attended Arkansas Tech University, graduating in 1987 and earning a commission into the Army through ROTC.

He was married to Army Brigadier General Amy E. Johnston (née Hannah), a public affairs officer whose tenure as the Army's Chief of Public Affairs was mired in controversy over her handling of the murder of specialist Vanessa Guillén, and a survey of her leadership climate in which 97% of subordinates described as hostile, including concerns of sexual and racial harassment. Amy Johnston retired in February 2022, after receiving a General Officer’s Memorandum of Reprimand.

Death 
On January 20, 2022, Johnston killed himself; an Army investigation is underway. He is buried in section 81 of Arlington National Cemetery.

References

1964 births
2022 deaths
Military personnel from Arkansas
Arkansas Tech University alumni
United States Army War College alumni
United States Army Command and General Staff College alumni
Recipients of the Defense Superior Service Medal
Recipients of the Legion of Merit
United States Army generals
People from Russellville, Arkansas
Burials at Arlington National Cemetery